Arden Hills is a city in Ramsey County, Minnesota, United States. The population was 9,552 at the 2010 census. Bethel University and Seminary is located in the city of Arden Hills.  Also, the campus of University of Northwestern – St. Paul straddles the Arden Hills – Roseville border.  The headquarters of Land O'Lakes and Catholic United Financial, a fraternal benefit society, are located there as well.

Geography

Interstate Highway 35W, Interstate Highway 694, U.S. Highway 10, Minnesota Highway 51/Snelling Avenue, and County Highway 96 are some of the main routes in the city.

Demographics

2010 census
As of the census of 2010, there were 9,552 people, 2,957 households, and 2,019 families residing in the city. The racial makeup of the city was 90.3% White, 1.7% African American, 0.2% Native American, 4.9% Asian, 1.0% from other races, and 1.9% from two or more races. Hispanic or Latino of any race were 2.8% of the population.

There were 2,957 households, of which 26.7% had children under the age of 18 living with them, 57.6% were married couples living together, 7.4% had a female householder with no husband present, 3.2% had a male householder with no wife present, and 31.7% were non-families. 26.5% of all households were made up of individuals, and 13.7% had someone living alone who was 65 years of age or older. The average household size was 2.45 and the average family size was 2.95.

The median age in the city was 34.8 years. 16.1% of residents were under the age of 18; 26.1% were between the ages of 18 and 24; 16.1% were from 25 to 44; 26.2% were from 45 to 64; and 15.6% were 65 years of age or older. The gender makeup of the city was 46.9% male and 53.1% female.

2000 census
As of the census of 2000, there were 9,652 people, 2,959 households, and 2,228 families residing in the city. The racial makeup of the city was 92.81% White, 1.32% African American, 0.20% Native American, 3.64% Asian, 0.04% Pacific Islander, 0.54% from other races, and 1.46% from two or more races. Hispanic or Latino of any race were 1.36% of the population.

There were 2,959 households, out of which 33.6% had children under the age of 18 living with them, 63.6% were married couples living together, 8.9% had a female householder with no husband present, and 24.7% were non-families. 19.9% of all households were made up of individuals, and 8.1% had someone living alone who was 65 years of age or older.  The average household size was 2.59 and the average family size was 2.98.

In the city, the population was spread out, with 20.0% under the age of 18, 20.3% from 18 to 24, 20.6% from 25 to 44, 25.2% from 45 to 64, and 13.9% who were 65 years of age or older.  The median age was 36 years. For every 100 females, there were 85.3 males.  For every 100 females age 18 and over, there were 81.6 males.

The median income for a household in the city was $64,773, and the median income for a family was $72,236. Males had a median income of $52,464 versus $38,906 for females. The per capita income for the city was $29,609.  About 1.8% of families and 3.9% of the population were below the poverty line, including 4.4% of those under age 18 and 0.8% of those age 65 or over.

Education

The following institutions are located in Arden Hills:
Bethel University
University of Northwestern – St. Paul  (The northern portion of the campus is located in Arden Hills, while the southern portion is in Roseville.)
Mounds View High School is a public Grade 9–12 school; it is one of two high schools in Independent School District 621; the other is Irondale High School.

Valentine Hills is the only elementary school in the city of Arden Hills; it is one of six elementary schools in Independent School District 621.

Government
Arden Hills uses a city council consisting of four councilmembers and a mayor. As of May 2020, the current mayor of Arden Hills is David Grant.

Economy
The headquarters of Land O'Lakes is in the city.

Politics

Top employers
According to Arden Hills' 2011 Comprehensive Annual Financial Report, the top employers in the city are:

Land Use

Any new development is expected to conform to the provisions of the very detailed (and sometimes contradictory) provisions of the Zoning Code, the primary stated purpose of which is to ensure fair application of City development regulations and to promote the public health, safety, and welfare.

Proposed deviations from the Zoning Code require the approval of a "variance" by the City Council, which takes into consideration the recommendations of the Planning Commission, staff, and members of the public.  Requests for variances are required to address the criteria in Minnesota State Statutes 462.357 Subd. 6.  Variances are intended to be used to address unique lot situations when the literal application of the Code would restrict reasonable use of the land and create an undue hardship as defined in Minnesota State Statutes.  The undue hardship cannot be created by the landowner or be based entirely on economic reasons.  Variance applications are reviewed by the Planning Commission, which is responsible for determining what constitutes "undue hardship."

Members of the Planning Commission are appointed by the City Council.  Commission members are to represent the interests of the community and evaluate development applications based on established City Codes and State Statutes.  Planning Commission members must be City residents, and they are unpaid volunteers.

Environmental protection

The City has a Shoreland Ordinance, which is typical of communities in Minnesota with lakes.  The text of the Ordinance states that uncontrolled use of shorelands of the City affects the public health, safety and general welfare by contributing to pollution of public waters. The purpose of the ordinance is to protect the public's health, safety, and welfare, and to provide for the wise development of shorelands of public waters. The Minnesota Legislature has delegated responsibility to the municipalities of the State to regulate the subdivision, use, and development of the shorelands of public waters, and thus preserve and enhance the quality of surface waters, preserve the economic and natural environmental values of shorelands, and provide for the wise utilization of waters and related land resources.  The State has not, however, required that the delegated responsibility be exercised with respect to enforcement of the corresponding laws, ordinances, and regulations, nor does the State require that the municipality have an established administrative sanction (fine) process at its disposal for the punishment of violators.

The City is located within the Rice Creek Watershed District.  In its effort to minimize storm water runoff, the District encourages minimization of impervious surfaces in developed areas.

Sports

The Twins Cities Titans of the NEFL are a semi-pro football team who play in Arden Hills.

New Minnesota Stadium
Ramsey County officials announced in May 2011 that they had reached an agreement with the Minnesota Vikings to be the team's local partner for a new stadium. The site of the stadium would be the former Twins Cities Army Ammunitions Plant in Arden Hills, which is about 10 miles from the Metrodome in Minneapolis. The agreement called for an $884 million stadium and an additional $173 million for on-site infrastructure, parking and environmental costs.

Ramsey county said the Vikings would commit $407 million to the project, which was about 44% of the stadium cost and 39% of the overall cost. The county's cost would have been $350 million, financed by a half-cent sales tax increase. The remaining amount of $300 million would be paid by Minnesota taxpayers.

Governor Mark Dayton said fixing the roads near the location would likely cost between $175 and 240 million.

This plan fell through, however, on March 1, 2012 when Governor Dayton announced the stadium would be built on the site of their former home, the Metrodome.

References

Populated places established in 1951
Cities in Minnesota
Cities in Ramsey County, Minnesota
1951 establishments in Minnesota